Simon Gächter (born 8 March 1965 in Nenzing, Vorarlberg) is an Austrian economist. He currently is  professor of the psychology of economic decision making at the University of Nottingham.

Gächter attended the University of Vienna, where he received his doctoral degree in economics in 1994. He earned his habilitation at the University of Zürich in 1999.

He is a fellow of the European Economic Association.

References

External links
 Personal website at the University of Nottingham

1965 births
Living people
Behavioral economists
University of Vienna alumni
Academics of the University of Nottingham
Fellows of the European Economic Association